Ropeway may refer to:

Cable transport
 Cableway, or cable transport, a broad class of transport modes that have cables
 Aerial lift, a means of cable transport in which cabins, cars, gondolas, or open chairs are hauled above the ground by means of one or more cables
 Aerial tramway, a type of aerial lift which cabins shuttle back and forth on cables
 Ropeway conveyor, a subtype of aerial lift, from which containers for goods rather than passenger cars are suspended

Other use
 Ropeway (sailing), a form of naval lifting device used to transport light stores and equipment across rivers or ravines; see Gyn